Louise Charlotte Françoise de Montesquiou, née de Le Tellier de Louvois-Courtanvaux de Montmirail de Creuzy (1765–1835) was a French courtier. She was the royal governess of Napoleon II from 1811 until 1814.

She was the daughter of Charles François César Le Tellier de Louvois-Courtanvaux de Montmirail de Creuzy, Marquis de Montmirail (1734–1765) and married to Anne Elisabeth Pierre de Montesquiou-Fezensac, in 1780. Her spouse was first equerry to the count of Provence before the French Revolution, and was appointed First Chamberlain to emperor Napoleon I of France in 1809.

She was appointed governess to the infant son of Napoleon and Marie Louise, the King of Rome, who would call her “Maman Quiou.”

References
 Joseph Baillio, Katharine Baetjer, Paul Lang, Vigée Le Brun

1765 births
1835 deaths
19th-century French people
French courtiers
Governesses to French royalty
People of the First French Empire
18th-century French people
19th-century French women
18th-century French women